How (currently stylised as HOW) is a British educational television programme created by Jack Hargreaves. It was produced from 1966 by Southern Television, for whom Hargreaves was a presenter and deputy programme controller. It lasted until 1981, when the company lost its franchise to TVS.

History

How was originally devised by Hargreaves for an audience of adults returning home from the pub. Its aim would be to give facts and demonstrations that could settle arguments or be used as pub tricks. A one-off pilot was broadcast at 11.15pm on 22 March 1966, to viewers in the Southern Television area only.

Following the pilot, Hargreaves felt the show might work better in an afternoon slot, aimed at making facts fun for children. Thus, at 5.25pm on 25 April 1966, Southern began live transmission of the first programme in the series of How, which would continue in a similar format for the next 15 years. Produced in Southern's Southampton studios, it provided answers to questions beginning with the word "How". Each episode began with the presenters all raising one hand and saying "How" simultaneously (mimicking the stereotypical Native American greeting). Topics commonly covered included science, history, mathematics and simple puzzles. The formula proved so successful that it was soon broadcast to the whole ITV network and given two slots per week.

The show was originally presented by Hargreaves alone. He was joined by Fred Dinenage (1966–1981), Jon Miller (1966–1981), Bunty James (1966–1969 and 1970–1976), Dr Tom Gaskell (1969), Jill Graham (1969–1970) and Marian Davies (1977–1981). Occasional stand-ins for Hargreaves included Barry Bucknell.

The series came to an end in 1981 when Southern Television lost its ITV franchise. The majority of episodes no longer exist.

Transmission guide

Original How (1966–1981) 
Series 1: 33 editions from 10 November 1966 – 29 June 1967
Series 2: 27 editions from 28 September 1967 – 27 March 1968
Series 3: 29 editions from 18 November 1968 – 23 June 1969
Series 4: 12 editions from 16 January 1970 – 3 April 1970
Series 5: 7 editions from 9 July 1970 – 20 August 1970
Series 6: 15 editions from 8 July 1971 – 26 August 1971
Series 7: 10 editions from 22 June 1972 – 24 August 1972
Series 8: 10 editions from 24 April 1973 – 26 June 1973
Series 9: 10 editions from 23 April 1974 – 25 June 1974
Special: Christmas 1974: 16 December 1974
Series 10: 7 editions from 8 January 1975 – 19 February 1975
Series 11: 11 editions 22 April 1975 – 1 July 1975
Series 12: 13 editions from 31 December 1975 – 24 March 1976
Series 13: 13 editions from 5 January 1977 – 30 March 1977
Series 14: 13 editions from 1 March 1978 – 24 May 1978
Series 15: 13 editions from 3 January 1979 – 28 March 1979
Series 16: 13 editions from 25 June 1980 – 24 September 1980
Series 17: 13 editions from 13 May 1981 – 19 August 1981

How 2 (1990–2006) 
Series 18: 10 editions from 21 September – 23 November 1990
Series 19: 10 editions from 23 September – 25 November 1991
Series 20: 10 editions from 7 September – 9 November 1992
Series 21: 15 editions from 6 September – 13 December 1993
Series 22: 15 editions from 5 September – 12 December 1994
Series 23: 14 editions from 4 September – 11 December 1995
Series 24: 15 editions from 9 September – 16 December 1996
Series 25: 16 editions from 1 September – 15 December 1997
Series 26: 13 editions from 5 January – 6 April 1999
Series 27: 13 editions from 10 January – 11 April 2000
Series 28: 20 editions from 22 January – 16 February 2001
Series 29: 10 editions from 11 – 22 February 2002
Series 30: 10 editions from 10 January – 14 March 2003
Series 31: 13 editions from 4 June – 27 August 2004
Series 32: 13 editions from 5 May – 1 September 2006

HOW (revival) (2020–present) 
Series 33: 10 editions from 15 November – 25 December 2020
Series 34: 10 editions from 25 April to 6 May 2022

Revival
In 1990, the series was revived as How 2 by TVS. Presenter Fred Dinenage made a return with Gareth Jones, Carol Vorderman, Gail McKenna and Sian Lloyd. The show aired on Children's ITV, known as CiTV and it ran for 16 years — until 2006.

In 2019 How 2 was made available on Amazon Prime Video in the UK.

Also in 2019, the CITV channel commissioned a further revival of the format. Due for air November 2020, with Fred Dinenage making his second return to the series franchise, alongside a new team of Vick Hope, Sam Homewood and Frankie Vu.

References

External links
How, A Television Heaven Review
 

1966 British television series debuts
1981 British television series endings
1960s British children's television series
1970s British children's television series
1980s British children's television series
British children's education television series
ITV children's television shows
English-language television shows
Television shows produced by Southern Television